MacBain may refer to:
Clan MacBain, Scottish clan

People:
Al MacBain (1925–2003), Liberal party member of the Canadian House of Commons
Alexander Macbain (1855–1907), Scottish philologist, best known today for An Etymological Dictionary of the Gaelic Language (1896)
John MacBain, the founder, president and chief executive officer of Trader Classified Media
Louise Blouin MacBain, also known as Louise Blouin, (born 1958), French-Canadian magazine publisher and philanthropist
Teresa MacBain, American atheist and activist

Geography:
Mount Macbain, prominent Antarctic mountain between the mouths of Cornwall Glacier and Helm Glacier in the Queen Elizabeth Range

See also
MacBrayne (disambiguation)
MacBrien
McBain (disambiguation)